The Manvelishvili was a Georgian noble family, originally from the province of Guria, and elevated to the princely rank by Vakhtang VI of Kartli, a Georgian king-in-exile in Russia in the 1720s. In 1738, they became the Russian subjects and were recognized as Princes Manvelov.

References 

Noble families of Georgia (country)
Russian noble families
Georgian-language surnames